The Jamaica women's national football team, nicknamed the "Reggae Girlz", is one of the top women's national football teams in the Caribbean region along with Trinidad and Tobago and Haiti. In 2008, the team was disbanded after it failed to get out of the group stage of Olympic Qualifying, which notably featured the United States and Mexico. The program was restarted in 2014 after a nearly six-year hiatus, finishing second at the 2014 Women's Caribbean Cup after losing 1–0 against Trinidad and Tobago in the final. The team is backed by ambassador Cedella Marley, the daughter of Bob Marley; she helps raise awareness for the team, encourages development, and provides for it financially. Jamaica qualified for the FIFA Women's World Cup for the first time in 2019, but the team was eliminated after losing all its matches in the group stage.

History

Founding
Women's football in Jamaica started with the founding of the Jamaican Women's Football association (founded by Andrea Lewis its first president) in 1987.

1990s
On 17 April 1991 the team competed in its first international match against Haiti, which they lost 1–0. In August 1994, the Reggae Girlz were defeated 10–0 by the United States.

2000s
In 2002, the Reggae Girlz qualified for the 2002 CONCACAF Women's Gold Cup (the qualifying tournament for the 2003 FIFA Women's World Cup, but lost all of their preliminary round games. In 2006, the team qualified for the Women’s Gold Cup again and finished in fourth place.

2010s
In 2010, due to lack of funding, the Jamaica Football Federation (JFF) cut the senior women’s program as well as the women’s Olympic program. Subsequently, the team was unable to participate in the qualifiers for the 2011 FIFA Women’s World Cup. In 2011, due to over three years of inactivity, Jamaica was not ranked in the FIFA Women's World Rankings.

In April 2014, Cedella Marley was named the team’s official ambassador and helped the team with their fundraising efforts. On 24 June 2014, the team launched the fundraising campaign "Strike Hard for the Reggae Girlz!" to raise $50,000 to pay for practices, travel expenses, housing, nutrition, and equipment in preparation for the 2014 CONCACAF Women's Championship where they hoped to secure a spot at the 2015 FIFA Women's World Cup.

In July 2014, it was announced that Jamaica was looking for players with Jamaican heritage in countries as far as the United Kingdom in order to improve their squad for the 2014 Women Caribbean Cup in Trinidad and Tobago. The team again went unranked by FIFA in June 2017.

In May 2018, Jamaica began the first round of Caribbean Zone qualifying, this was the first time the team had assembled in two years. Jamaica won their group and advanced to the final round of Caribbean Zone qualifying. They hosted the final round tournament and won all four games securing their spot at the 2018 CONCACAF Women's Championship. The same year, Jamaica competed in the 2018 Central American and Caribbean Games. In the group stage, they had a record of one win and two losses, but did not advance to the knockout round. At the 2018 CONCACAF Women's Championship, Jamaica was drawn into Group B alongside Canada, Costa Rica and Cuba. In their first match against Canada, they played well but lost 2–0. Jamaica secured an upset 1–0 victory over Costa Rica in their second match, thanks in part to the great play of goalkeeper Sydney Schneider. In their final group match against Cuba, Jamaica won 9–0. As a result of Costa Rica losing their final group match, Jamaica finished second in their group and advanced to the semi-finals where they would face the number one ranked United States. The US defeated Jamaica 6–0, in the semi-final. Jamaica won the third place match against Panama on penalty kicks, securing a spot at the 2019 FIFA Women's World Cup. Jamaica is the first Caribbean nation to ever qualify for a Women's World Cup and became the first Caribbean country to have both men's and women's teams to participate in men's and women's World Cup. Interestingly, its male counterparts also qualified to the only FIFA World Cup also in France.

Jamaica placed in Group C with Italy, Australia and Brazil, and was considered as a dark horse, being rated the lowest in the group. Eventually, they finished last in the group after losing all matches but scored a lone goal by Havana Solaun.

2020s
After several coaching changes, Lorne Donaldson, was named head coach in 2022. In July 2022, Jamaica qualified for their 2nd World Cup, which is a historic feat, considering its men's counterparts have been unable to do the same.

Results and fixtures

The following is a list of match results in the last 12 months, as well as any future matches that have been scheduled.

Legend

2022

2023

 Jamaica Fixtures and Results – Soccerway.com

Coaching staff

Current coaching staff

Manager history

Players

Current squad

Caps and goals are current as of 13 November 2022 after the match against .

Recent call-ups
The following players have been called up in the past 12 months.

This list may be incomplete.

WD

PRE Preliminary squad

(Players are listed within position group by order of latest call-up, caps, and then alphabetically)

Previous squads

FIFA Women's World Cup
2019 FIFA Women's World Cup

CONCACAF W Championship
2014 CONCACAF Women's Championship
2018 CONCACAF Women's Championship

Records

Players in bold are still active, at least at club level.

Competitive record

FIFA Women's World Cup

*Draws include knockout matches decided on penalty kicks.

Olympic Games

*Draws include knockout matches decided on penalty kicks.

CONCACAF W Championship

*Draws include knockout matches decided on penalty kicks.

Pan American Games

*Draws include knockout matches decided on penalty kicks.

Central American and Caribbean Games

*Draws include knockout matches decided on penalty kicks.

CFU Women's Caribbean Cup

*Draws include knockout matches decided on penalty kicks.

Other tournaments

FIFA World Ranking

Last update was on June 25, 2021
Source:

 Best Ranking   Worst Ranking   Best Mover   Worst Mover

See also
Sport in Jamaica
Football in Jamaica
Women's football in Jamaica
Jamaica men's national football team

References

External links
Official website  
FIFA profile